Downtown Sarasota Historic District is a  historic district in Sarasota, Florida. It is bound by 1st Street, Orange Avenue, State Street, Gulf Stream Avenue and North Pineapple Avenue. On April 9, 2009, it was added to the U.S. National Register of Historic Places.

The historic district consists of 51 buildings. Six contributing properties in the district have been listed individually on the National Register:
 American National Bank Building
 DeMarcay Hotel
 Kress Building
 Roth Cigar Factory
 Edwards Theatre
 Worth's Block.

Gallery

References

Historic districts on the National Register of Historic Places in Florida
National Register of Historic Places in Sarasota County, Florida
Buildings and structures in Sarasota, Florida